Bo Spellerberg (born 24 July 1979) is a Danish handball player, currently playing and coach for Swiss Handball League side TSV St. Otmar St. Gallen. He is a two-time European Champion with the Danish national team, after winning both the 2008 and 2012 championships in Norway and Serbia.

In 2011, he also won silver medal at the World Championships in Sweden. He emulated this achievement at the 2013 World Championships in Spain.

Clubs
Bo Spellerberg came to CB Cantabria, along with Gábor Császár who played in Viborg HK at the time, on a loan contract in 2008. The two player was brought in to help the team survive in Liga ASOBAL, during remaining three matches in the 2007–2008 season. CB Cantabria ended the season in 14th place and was dissolved after the season.

References

External links

1979 births
Living people
Danish male handball players
Olympic handball players of Denmark
Handball players at the 2008 Summer Olympics
Handball players at the 2012 Summer Olympics
KIF Kolding players
People from Gladsaxe Municipality
Sportspeople from the Capital Region of Denmark